Nos vemos papa is a 2011 Mexican drama film directed by Luca Carreras. The film is Lucía's first directorial venture. It was an official entry for the 17th International Film Festival of Kerala

Synopsis
Pilar loses the one thing in life that mattered to her and, from that moment on time stops. The present begins blending with the past, and the heroine withdraws into a world of her own. An intimate drama about the extreme emotions connected to the loss of someone on whom our lives depend.

Cast
Cecilia Suárez ... Pilar
Moisés Arizmendi ...Marco
Gabriela de la Garza ... Gabriela
Arturo Barba ... José
Marcelo D'Andrea ... Juan Guillen
Verónica Langer ... Tía Úrsula
Elisa De Llaca ... Mimi

External links
 

Mexican drama films
2011 films
2010s Spanish-language films
2010s Mexican films